Eachanari is a suburb of Coimbatore city in Tamil Nadu, India. The suburb and its environs are also home to the Eachanari Vinayagar Temple. It exists within the Coimbatore City Municipal Corporation jurisdiction.

Geography

Transport

Eachanari Flyover
A flyover at Eachanari has been laid by the National Highways Authority of India (NHAI) in 2019, at the L&T Bypass signal junction, in order to reduce traffic congestion.

Temples
Eachanari Vinayagar Temple is among 11 temples in the Coimbatore, India area.

Politics
Eachanari is a part of Kinathukadavu (state assembly constituency) and Pollachi (Lok Sabha constituency)

References

External links 
 

Suburbs of Coimbatore
Cities and towns in Coimbatore district